The 1926 Soviet Census took place in December 1926. It was an important tool in the state-building of the USSR, provided the government with important ethnographic information, and helped in the transformation from Imperial Russian society to Soviet society. The decisions made by ethnographers in determining the ethnicity (narodnost) of individuals, whether in the Asiatic or European parts of the former Russian Empire, through the drawing up of the "List of Ethnicities of the USSR", and how borders were drawn in mixed areas had a significant influence on Soviet policies. Ethnographers, statisticians, and linguists were drawing up questionnaires and list of ethnicities for the census. However, they also had the more ambitious goal of deliberately transforming their identities according to the principles of Marxism–Leninism. As Anastas Mikoyan put it, the Soviet Union was: "creating and organising new nations".

Previous censuses
The First All-Union Census of the Soviet Union followed two partial censuses carried out by the Bolsheviks following their seizure of power in Russia. The first, the general census of 1920, took place during the Civil War and the Soviet-Polish War. It was thus unable to deal with the Crimea, much of Transcaucasia, Ukraine, Byelorussia, Far Eastern, Siberian, and Central Asian parts of the Soviet Union as well as with its Far Northern parts. Yet it is worth to note that there was only 15,000,000 population increase between 1920 and 1926 constituting in some 131,304,931 people according to the TIME magazine while is still undisclosed in Russian history. The 1923 Census was restricted to cities. Prior to the Russian Revolution, the only Russian Empire Census was done in 1897.

Methodology
By classifying the population in terms of narodnosti (nationalities)—as opposed to tribe or clan—along with policies which gave these nations land, resources, and rights, experts and local elites were encouraged to interfere with the information collecting.

List of ethnicities
This list, called , vol. 7, Moscow 1927, was developed by the Central Statistical Administration of the USSR.

Russian – 77 791 124
Ukrainian – 31 194 976
Belarusian – 4 738 923
Polish – 782 334
Czech
Slovak
Serb
Bulgarian – 111 296
Latvian – 151 410
Lithuanian – 41 463
Latgalian
Samogitian (Zhmud)
German – 1 238 549
British
Swedish
Dutch
Italian
French
Romanian – 278 903
Moldovan – 278 903
Greek – 213 765
Albanian (Arnaut)
Jewish (Ashkenazi) – 2,599,973
Crimean Jewish – 6,383
Mountain Jewish (Dag Chufut) – 25,974 
Georgian Jewish – 21,471
Bukharan Jewish (Dzhugur) – 18,698
Karaim – 8,324
Finnish
Leningrad Finnish (Chukhon)
Karelian
Tavastian
Estonian – 154 666
Vepsian (Chud)
Vod (Vote)
Izhorian (Ingrian)
Kven
Lopar (Sami people)
Zyrian
Permyak
Udmurt (Votiak)
Besermyan
Mari (Cheremis)
Mordva (Moksha, Erzya, Teryukhan, Karatai)
Magyar (Hungarian)
Gagauz
Chuvash – 1 117 419
Tatar – 2 916 536
Mishar (Meshcheriak)
Bashkir – 713 693
Nagaybak
Nogai
Gypsy
Kalmyk
Mongol
Buryat
Sart-Kalmyk
Mansi (Vogul)
Khanty (Ostyak)
Selkup (Ostyak-Samoyed)
Nenets (Samoyed)
Yurak
Soyot (Uriankhai)
Barabin (Barbara Tartar)
Bukharan (Bukharlyk)
Chernevyy Tatar (Tubalar, Tuba-Kizhi)
Altai (Altai-Kizhi, Mountain or White Kalmyk)
Teleut
Telengit (Telengut)
Kumandin (Lebedin, Ku-Kohzi)
Shors
Kharagas (Tuba, Kharagaz)
Kızıl (Kyzyl)
Kachin
Sagai
Koybal
Beltir
Dolgan (Dolgan-Iakut)
Yakut (Sakha, Urangkhai-Sakha) – 240 709
Tungus (Ovenk, Murchen)
Lamut
Orochon
Goldai (Nanai)
Olchi (Mangun, Ulchi)
Negidal (Negda, Eleke Beye)
Orochi
Udegei (Ude)
Orok
Manegir
Samogir
Manchurian
Chukchi
Koryaks
Kamchadal (Itel'men)
Gilyak (Nivkhi)
Yukagir
Chuvan
Aleut
Eskimo
Enisei (Ket, Enisei Ostiak)
Aino (Ainu, Kuchi)
Chinese
Korean
Japanese
Georgian (Kartvelian) – 1 821 184
Ajar
Megeli (Mingrelian)
Laz (Chan)
Svan (Svanetian)
Abkhaz (Abkhazian) – 56 957
Cherkess (Adyghe)
Beskesek-Abaza (Abazin)
Kabard
Ubykh
Chechen (Nakh, Nakhchuo)
Ingush (Galgai, Kist)
Batsbi (Tsova-Tish, Batswa)
Maistvei
Lezgin
Tabasaran
Agul
Archi
Rutul (Mykhad)
Tsakhur
Khinalug
Dzhek (Dzhektsy)
Khaput (Gaputlin, Khaputlin)
Kryz
Budukh (Budug)
Udin
Dargin
Kubachin (Ughbug)
Lak (Kazi-Kumukh)
Avar (Avartsy, Khunzal)
Andi (Andiitsy, Kwanally)
Botlog (Buikhatli)
Godoberi
Karatai
Akhvakh
Bagulal (Kvanandin)
Chamalal
Tindi (Tindal, Idera)
Didoi (Tsez)
Kvarshi
Kapuchin (Bezheta)
Khunzal (Enzebi, Nakhad)
Armenian – 1 567 568
Hemshin
Arab
Aisor (Assyrian, Syriac, Chaldean)
Kaytak (Karakaitak)
Bosha (Karachi, Armenian Gypsy)
Ossetian – 272 272
Kurd
Yazid
Talysh
Tat
Persian
Karachai
Kumyk
Balkar (Mountain Tartar, Malkar)
Karakalpak
Turk
Ottoman Turk (Osmanli)
Samarkand and Fergana Turk
Turkmen – 763 940
Kirgiz (Kyrgyz, Kara-Kirgiz)
Karakalpak – 146 317
Kypchak
Kashgar
Taranchi
Kazakh (Kirgiz-Kazakh, Kirgiz-Kaisak) – 3 968 289
Kurama
Uzbek – 3 904 622
Dungan
Afghan
Tajik – 978 680
Vakhan
Ishkashim
Shugnan
Yagnob
Yazgul
Iranian
Jemshid
Beludji
Berber
Khazara
Hindu (Indian)
Other Ethnicities
Ethnicities not noted or noted inexactly
a) Tavlin
b) Kryashen
c) Teptyar
d) Uigar
e) Oirot
f) Khakass
g) Others
191. Foreign subjects

Composition of the USSR 

For the Transcaucasian Socialist Federative Soviet Republic, Georgians were considered the Titular Nationality.

Population of the USSR sorted by most common nationalities in 1926

Population by republics 
  – 100,891,244 (urban 17,442,655)
 Kazakh ASSR – 6,503,006 (urban 539,249)
 Kirghiz ASSR – 993,004 (urban 121,080)
  – 29,018,187 (urban 5,373,553)
 Moldavian ASSR – 572,114
  – 5,272,801 (urban 1,102,218)
 Tajik ASSR – 827,200
  – 4,983,240 (urban 847,830)
 
  – 2,666,494 (urban 594,221)
  – 2,314,571 (urban 649,557)
  – 880,464 (urban 167,098)
  – 1,000,914 (urban 136,982)
 Total in the Soviet Union – 147,027,915 (urban 26,314,114)

References

External links 
 All-Union census 1926 (Demoskop Weekly) (in Russian)

Further reading
 

Ethnic groups in Russia
Censuses in the Soviet Union
1926 in the Soviet Union
1926 censuses